Fortis is a propelled ground vehicle ("aerojeep") designed by Zhukovsky Aerodynamics Research Institute and by the group of students from MAMI Moscow State Technical University. It can ride both on ground and water while maintaining good stability.

References

External links
Aerocon website

Wheeled amphibious vehicles